was a video game development, entertainment and holding company.

An international division was later founded in British Columbia, Canada, which acquired all intellectual property and shares of the original Valhalla Game Studios and other affiliates, effectively making them subsidiaries of the Canadian company. To differentiate, the original Valhalla Game Studios is alternatively referred to as VGS Japan. VGS Japan is best known for Devil's Third, their flagship title which went through a long development cycle.

Valhalla's parent, Wake Up Interactive, merged the staff and operations of Valhalla Game Studios into another subsidiary, Soleil Ltd., in December 2021, effectively closing down Valhalla.

Staff 
The studio is run by former Tecmo staff: Satoshi Kanematsu, who worked on Monster Rancher and Rygar, and Tomonobu Itagaki, a game designer known for his work on the Dead or Alive and Ninja Gaiden series.

List of games developed by VGS Japan

Projects 
Since 2009, the company has been working on Devil's Third, a "hyper-violent shooter". Originally developed as a title for the PlayStation 3 and Xbox 360, the game was eventually developed exclusively for the Wii U. Following the closure of development partner THQ, intellectual property rights to Devil's Third were given back to Valhalla Game Studios. The game was re-announced by Nintendo at E3 2014; the title released in 2015. Critical response aggregator Metacritic assigned Devil's Third an approval score of 43%, based on 54 reviews, indicating "generally unfavorable reviews". In November 2015, it was announced that Valhalla and Nexon would be releasing Devil's Third Online, a PC port of Devil's Third'''s multiplayer mode, as part of a partnership. The title will go into open beta in December in Japan and will release in the same region in late January. It was confirmed that features that were absent in the original, such as voice chat, would be added to Devil's Third Online''. After a delay, the title released in Japan on June 8, 2016.

Litigation 

In November 2015, it was reported that Valhalla Motion Pictures was suing Valhalla Game Studios for trademark infringement, likely due to their similar name and logo.

On March 24, 2016, the United States Patent and Trademark Office denied Valhalla Game Studios' trademark registration on the grounds that there was likelihood of confusion between Valhalla Motion Pictures and Valhalla Games Studios' mark.

Notes

References 

Japanese companies established in 2008
2021 disestablishments in Japan
Canadian companies established in 2014
Video game companies established in 2008
Video game companies established in 2014
Video game companies disestablished in 2021
Defunct video game companies of Canada
Defunct video game companies of Japan
Video game development companies